The work called , sometimes referred to as  (Books from the Founding of the City), is a monumental history of ancient Rome, written in Latin between 27 and 9 BC by Livy, a Roman historian. The work covers the period from the legends concerning the arrival of Aeneas and the refugees from the fall of Troy, to the city's founding in 753 BC, the expulsion of the Kings in 509 BC, and down to Livy's own time, during the reign of the emperor Augustus. The last event covered by Livy is the death of Drusus in 9 BC. 35 of 142 books, about a quarter of the work, are still extant. The surviving books deal with the events down to 293 BC (books 1–10), and from 219 to 166 BC (books 21–45).

Contents

Corpus
The History of Rome originally comprised 142 "books", thirty-five of which—Books 1–10 with the Preface and Books 21–45—still exist in reasonably complete form. Damage to a manuscript of the 5th century resulted in large gaps (lacunae) in Books 41 and 43–45 (small lacunae exist elsewhere); that is, the material is not covered in any source of Livy's text.

A fragmentary palimpsest of the 91st book was discovered in the Vatican Library in 1772, containing about a thousand words (roughly three paragraphs), and several papyrus fragments of previously unknown material, much smaller, have been found in Egypt since 1900, most recently about 40 words from Book 11, unearthed in 1986.

Some passages are nevertheless known thanks to quotes from ancient authors, the most famous being on the death of Cicero, quoted by Seneca the Elder.

Abridgements

Livy was abridged, in antiquity, to an epitome, which survives for Book 1, but was itself abridged in the fourth century into the so-called Periochae, which is simply a list of contents.  The Periochae survive for the entire work, except for books 136 and 137.  

In Oxyrhynchus, a similar summary of books 37–40, 47–55, and only small fragments of 88 was found on a roll of papyrus that is now in the British Museum classified as P.Oxy.IV 0668. There is another fragment, named P.Oxy.XI 1379, which represents a passage from the first book (I, 6) and that shows a high level of correctness. However, the Oxyrhynchus Epitome is damaged and incomplete.

Chronology

The entire work covers the following periods:

Books 1–5 – The legendary founding of Rome (including the landing of Aeneas in Italy and the founding of the city by Romulus), the period of the kings, and the early republic down to its conquest by the Gauls in 390 BC.

Books 6–10 – Wars with the Aequi, Volsci, Etruscans, and Samnites, down to 292 BC.

Books 11–20 – The period from 292 to 218, including the First Punic War (lost).

Books 21–30 – The Second Punic War, from 218 to 202.

Books 31–45 – The Macedonian and other eastern wars from 201 to 167.

Books 46 to 142 are all lost:

Books 46–70 – The period from 167 to the outbreak of the Social War in 91.

Books 71–90 – The civil wars between Marius and Sulla, to the death of Sulla in 78.

Books 91–108 – From 78 BC through the end of the Gallic War, in 50.

Books 109–116 – From the Civil War to the death of Caesar (49–44).

Books 117–133 – The wars of the triumvirs down to the death of Antonius (44–30).

Books 134–142 – The rule of Augustus down to the death of Drusus (9).

Table of contents

Style

Livy wrote in a mixture of annual chronology and narrative. This emerged from his decision to organise his narrative on a year-by-year scheme with regular announcements of elections of "consuls, prodigies, temple dedications, triumphs, and the like". This kind of year-by-year list of events is termed "annalistic history". Livy employed annalistic features to associate his history with the dominant traditional of Roman history, which was to write these annalistic chronicles; in so doing, he "imbued his history with an aura of continuity and stability" along with "pontifical authority".

The first and third decades (see below) of Livy's work are written so well that Livy has become a sine qua non of curricula in Golden Age Latin. Some have argued that subsequently the quality of his writing began to decline, and that he becomes repetitious and wordy. Of the 91st book Barthold Georg Niebuhr says "repetitions are here so frequent in the small compass of four pages and the prolixity so great, that we should hardly believe it to belong to Livy...." Niebuhr accounts for the decline by supposing "the writer has grown old and become loquacious...", going so far as to conjecture that the later books were lost because copyists refused to copy such low-quality work.

However, Livy also employed repetitive and formulaic wording in description of repetitive military affairs, described by Ogilvie as "mechanical and careless". Modern readers, however, view Livy's repetitive prose more positively at least in performance of prayers, blessings, and public religious rituals.

A digression in Book 9, Sections 17–19, suggests that the Romans would have beaten Alexander the Great if he had lived longer and had turned west to attack the Romans, making this digression one of the oldest known written alternate history scenarios.

Publication

The first five books were published between 27 and 25 BC. The first date mentioned is the year Augustus received that eponymous title: twice in the first five books Livy uses it. For the second date, Livy lists the closings of the temple of Janus but omits that of 25 (it had not happened yet).

Livy continued to work on the History for much of the rest of his life, publishing new material by popular demand. This explains why the work falls naturally into 12 packets, mainly groups of 10 books, or decades, sometimes of 5 books (pentads or ) and the rest without any packet order. The scheme of dividing it entirely into decades is a later innovation of copyists.

The second pentad did not come out until 9 or after, some 16 years after the first pentad. In Book IX Livy states that the Cimminian Forest was more impassable than the German had been recently, referring to the Hercynian Forest (Black Forest) first opened by Drusus and Ahenobarbus. One can only presume that in the interval Livy's first pentad had been such a success that he had to yield to the demand for more.

Manuscripts
There is no uniform system of classifying and naming manuscripts. Often the relationship of one manuscript (MS) to another remains unknown or changes as perceptions of the handwriting change. Livy's release of chapters by packet diachronically encouraged copyists to copy by decade. Each decade has its own conventions, which do not necessarily respect the conventions of any other decade. A family of MSS descend through copying from the same MSS (typically lost). MSS vary widely; to produce an emendation or a printed edition was and is a major task. Usually variant readings are given in footnotes.

First decade
All of the manuscripts (except one) of the first ten books (first decade) of Ab urbe condita, which were copied through the Middle Ages and were used in the first printed editions, are derived from a single recension commissioned by Quintus Aurelius Symmachus, consul, AD 391. A recension is made by comparing extant manuscripts and producing a new version, an emendation, based on the text that seems best to the editor. The latter then "subscribed" to the new MS by noting on it that he had emended it.

Symmachus, probably using the authority of his office, commissioned Tascius Victorianus to emend the first decade. Books I–IX bear the subscription Victorianus emendabam dominis Symmachis, "I Victorianus emended (this) by the authority of Symmachus." Books VI–VIII include another subscription preceding it, that of Symmachus' son-in-law, Nicomachus Flavianus, and Books III–V were also emended by Flavianus' son, Appius Nicomachus Dexter, who says he used his relative Clementianus' copy. This recension and family of descendant MSS is called the Nicomachean, after two of the subscribers. From it several MSS descend (incomplete list):

Epigraphists go on to identify several hands and lines of descent. A second family of the first decade consists of the Verona Palimpsest, reconstructed and published by Theodore Mommsen, 1868; hence the Veronensis MSS. It includes 60 leaves of Livy fragments covering Books III-VI. The handwriting style is dated to the 4th century, only a few centuries after Livy.

During the Middle Ages, there were constant rumours that the complete books of the History of Livy lay hidden in the library of a Danish or German Monastery. One individual even affirmed under oath in the court of Martin V that he had seen the whole work, written in Lombardic script, in a monastery in Denmark. All of these rumours were later found to be unsubstantiated.

Veracity 

The orthodox view is that "Livy was a very poor historian indeed, whether by ancient or modern standards". This is rooted in a few major reasons. He did "no primary research", relying "exclusively on earlier histories". His understanding of those sources was poor: with Livy relating the same event twice on multiple occasions. Moreover, "there are clear signs that his Greek was not good enough to understand properly one of his major sources, the Greek historian Polybius", which he followed closely for events in the east in books 31 to 45.

Livy also did not intend to produce a history in terms of cataloguing and understanding the past, but rather, in terms of preserving a "memory ... [that] equips the reader with a sense of wrong and right as determined or exemplified by the actions of one’s predecessors". Moreover, the work was also written "under the shadow of the new emperor" with the goal of supporting "the idea that the Augustan principate was the culmination of Roman history".

While other sources have attempted to rehabilitate Livy's history in terms of its literary quality (for example, DS Levene's Livy on the Hannibalic War), this is not a defence of the history's historicity. Modern criticism of Livy also goes into the "inaccuracy of his battle accounts, the vagueness of his geography, ... the excessive partiality shown to one or [an]other of his 'heroes', and in general the highly rhetorical nature of not only his speeches but also of his dramatic narrations".

However, judgement on Livy's whole work ought to be withheld insofar as only the first third of Ab urbe condita survives; the portions of Livy that survive, heavily relying on an uncritical repetition of earlier sources, may not be the same approach he took for later periods of the republic or his own time, where he would have needed "to do his own research using contemporary testimonies from eyewitnesses[,] the records of the senate and the assemblies[, and records of the] speeches of the great orators".

Historicity

The details of Livy's History vary from the legendary and mythical stories at the beginning to detailed accounts of real events toward the end. Livy, in his preface on discussing the early history of Rome, noted the difficulties of interpreting or reconciling the sources in his own day:

So many chronological errors, magistrates appearing differently in different authors, suggest ... you cannot tell which consuls came after which or what belonged [to] any one year...

It is not easy to prefer one thing over the other or one author over another. I think that the tradition has been contaminated... since various families have fraudulently arrogated to themselves the repute of deeds and offices. As a result, both individuals' deeds and the public records of events have certainly been thrown into confusion. Nor is there any writer contemporary with those times who could serve as a reliable standard.

Livy too recognised that the early years of Rome were profoundly ahistorical, saying "the traditions of what happened prior to the foundation of the city or whilst it was being built, are more fitted to adorn the creations of the poet than the authentic records of the historian". The first book has been one of the most significant sources of the various accounts of the traditional legend of Romulus and Remus. However, when comparing Livy's account of the kingdom to that of Dionysius of Halicarnassus, his scepticism is better evident, as he omitted "many stories which seemed rather improbable to him". And in general, the early parts of the books are important accounts of early Rome surviving from antiquity.

But while Livy did recognise "the higher reliability of older contemporary authors compared to younger ones" but did little to ensure that his history was internally consistent or follow his own insights on unreliability regularly, preferring the story of his chosen choice without changes, "even if he afterward detected capital errors".

Livy's treatment of his own sources was more in terms of arranging material and synthesising a narrative rather than engaging in original research into official documents; in doing so, he "did little more than [trying] to reconcile discrepancies in his sources by using arguments from probability". However, Livy did not substantially grapple with the possibility that annalists knew how to invent probable stories. Furthermore, rarely did Livy provide the names of his sources, especially in the long passages where he followed one major source with infrequent comparisons to other sources to correct errors. Fortunately, Livy's goal in telling existing narratives with "better style and arrangement" means he seemingly did not introduce into his history "invented episodes of exaggerations".

Livy's sources

Livy's work "came at the end of a long line of historians ... conventionally known as the 'annalistic tradition'". Where he relied on these sources (along with other narrative sources available in his day) his principle was similar to that of Herodotus': "tell what he had been told".

Roman historiography goes back to Quintus Fabius Pictor who wrote , heavily influenced by Greek historiographical canons and methods. Other annalists included Quintus Ennius, Marcius Porcius Cato the censor, Lucius Calpurnius Piso Frugi, Lucius Cassius Hemina, Gnaeus Gellius, Vennonius, Valerius Antias, Licinius Macer, Quintus Claudius Quadrigarius, and Quintus Aelius Tubero. The last three annalists (operating in the first century BC) are, however, "widely believed to have been less scrupulous than their second-century predecessors", supplying stories about the archaic period "from their own imaginations". However, as to certain elements of his narrative, Livy may have relied on "unscrupulous annalists" who "did not hesitate to invent a series of face-saving victories".

Livy, did not use the libri lintei or the annales maximi kept by the pontifex maximus; nor did he "walk around in Rome, or elsewhere, to discover inscriptions or other new documents". The difficulties of using the senate's own archives, documented in speeches by Cicero, "hint... at the possibilities of falsifying evidence" and the poor transmission of authoritative historical records.

Later influences

Machiavelli 
Niccolò Machiavelli's work on republics, Discourses on Livy, is presented as a commentary on the History of Rome.

Translations
The first complete rendering of Ab urbe condita into English was Philemon Holland's translation published in 1600. According to Considine, "it was a work of great importance, presented in a grand folio volume of 1,458 pages, and dedicated to [Queen Elizabeth I]".

A notable translation of Livy titled History of Rome was made by B.O. Foster in 1919 for the Loeb Classical Library. A partial translation by Aubrey de Sélincourt was printed in 1960–1965 for Penguin Classics.

The version of Livy available on Wikisource is that from the 1905 translation of Reverend Canon Roberts for Everyman's Library.

Notes

References

Citations

Sources

Further reading

Briscoe, John

External links

Primary sources

Secondary sources
 
 
 

Latin works about history
History books about ancient Rome
1st-century BC Latin books